Dictyota sandvicensis is a species of brown seaweed in the family Dictyotaceae.

References

Dictyotaceae
Plants described in 1859